The  (English: 2nd Premier League West) was the second-highest level of the German football league system in the west of Germany from 1949 until the formation of the Bundesliga in 1963. It covered the state of North Rhine-Westphalia, the most populous state of Germany.

Overview
The 2. Oberliga West was formed in 1949 with two groups of sixteen teams each, as a feeder league to Oberliga West. It was the first of the three 2nd Oberligas, the other two being 2. Oberliga Süd (formed in 1950) and 2. Oberliga Südwest (in 1951). The league adopted a single group format starting from 1952: The top two teams of the 2. Oberliga gained promotion to the Oberliga while the bottom two teams were relegated to the Verbandsliga'''s. Some years, however, exceptions applied and the number of promoted and relegated teams altered.

In July 1955 the Westdeutscher Fußballverband decided to disband the league from 1956, but the German federation DFB outlawed this decision and the league continued its existence.

Below the 2. Oberliga West ranked the Amateurligas, varying in numbers (and names) but split into three zones, Niederrhein, Mittelrhein, and Westfalen :Niederrhein: Landesliga Niederrhein in two groups until 1952, then three groups. From 1956 single-group Verbandsliga Niederrhein.Mittelrhein: Landesliga Mittelrhein in a single group in 1950, two groups from 1951. From 1956 single-group Verbandsliga Mittelrhein.Westfalen:' Landesliga Westfalen in two groups in 1950, single group in 1951 and 1952, five groups from 1953. From 1956 two groups, Verbandsliga Westfalen 1 and Verbandsliga Westfalen 2.

The 2. Oberliga West existed until 1963, when it was replaced by the Regionalliga West as the second division for North Rhine-Westphalia.

SpVgg Herten is the only team to have played in the league for all 14 seasons.

Schwarz-Weiß Essen became the first second-division side to win the German Cup when they did so in 1959, an achievement later repeated by Kickers Offenbach and Hannover 96 in the history of German football.

Disbanding of the 2. Oberliga
In 1963, the league was disbanded in favor of the new Regionalliga. The first eight teams from this season went to the Regionalliga West. The clubs placed from ninth to sixteenth were relegated to the Verbandsligas.
VfB Bottrop
Duisburg 48/99
SpVgg Herten
STV Horst-Emscher
Sportfreunde Siegen
Rot-Weiß Essen
Arminia Bielefeld
Duisburger SV

The following teams were relegated to the Amateurligas:
To the Verbandsliga Niederrhein: SV Neukirchen, Duisburger FV 08
To the Verbandsliga Mittelrhein: Bonner FV
To the Verbandsliga Westfalen-Nordost: Eintracht Gelsenkirchen, Sportfreunde Gladbeck
To the Verbandsliga Westfalen-Südwest: SC Dortmund 95, SV Sodingen, VfL Bochum

Winners and runners-up of the 2. Oberliga

 Placings in the 2. Oberliga West 
The league placings from 1949 to 1963:

Key

NotesSSV Wuppertal and TSG Vohwinkel merged in 1954 to form Wuppertaler SV.Union Gelsenkirchen merged with Alemannia Gelsenkirchen to form Eintracht Gelsenkirchen in 1950.

 References 

Sources
 Kicker Almanach,  The yearbook on German football from Bundesliga to Oberliga, since 1937, published by the Kicker Sports Magazine
 Die Deutsche Liga-Chronik 1945-2005''  History of German football from 1945 to 2005 in tables, publisher: DSFS, published: 2006

External links
 Das deutsche Fussball Archiv  Historic German league tables
 Oberliga West at Fussballdaten.de 

Defunct Oberligas (football)
Football competitions in North Rhine-Westphalia
1949 establishments in West Germany
1963 disestablishments in Germany
Sports leagues established in 1949
Ger
Sports leagues disestablished in 1963